Opportunistic Wireless Encryption (OWE) is a Wi-Fi standard which ensures that the communication between each pair of endpoints is protected from other endpoints. Unlike conventional Wi-Fi, it provides "Individualized Data Protection" such that data traffic between a client and access point is "individualized". Other clients can still sniff and record this traffic, but they can't decrypt it.

OWE is an extension to IEEE 802.11. it is an encryption technique similar to that of Simultaneous Authentication of Equals (SAE) and is specified by Internet Engineering Task Force (IETF) in RFC 8110 with devices certified as Wi-Fi Certified Enhanced Open by the Wi-Fi Alliance.

See also
 Wi-Fi Protected Access

References

Further reading
 

Internet privacy